Mackenzie House is a heritage-listed house located at 29 Fitzgerald Street, Windsor, City of Hawkesbury, New South Wales, Australia. It was added to the New South Wales State Heritage Register on 2 April 1999.

History

Mackenzie House was built  1915. At one stage it was used to house the rector of the adjacent Windsor Uniting Church.

It now houses a psychology and psychiatry practice.

Heritage listing 
Mackenzie House was listed on the New South Wales State Heritage Register on 2 April 1999.

References

Bibliography

Attribution 

New South Wales State Heritage Register
Windsor, New South Wales
Houses in Sydney
Articles incorporating text from the New South Wales State Heritage Register